Blutwurstia is an extinct genus of lizards from the Eocene of Wyoming. The type and only species is Blutwurstia oliviae. It is closely related to the modern lizard Xenosaurus. The genus name is derived from the German for blood sausage.

References 

Xenosauridae
Prehistoric lizard genera
Eocene North America
Biota of Wyoming
Fossil taxa described in 2022